Henry Hamlin (by 1484 – 1549/1550), of Exeter, Devon, was an English politician.

Family
Hamlin married the daughter of Exeter MP, Thomas Andrew.

Career
He was a Member (MP) of the Parliament of England for Exeter in 1529.

References

15th-century births
1550 deaths
Members of the Parliament of England (pre-1707) for Exeter
English MPs 1529–1536